The Van Ophuijsen Spelling System was used as the orthography for the Indonesian language from 1901 to 1947. Before the Van Ophuijsen Spelling System was in force, the Malay language (and consequently Indonesian) in the Dutch East Indies (now Indonesia) did not have a standardized spelling, or was written in the Jawi script. In 1947, the Van Ophuijsen Spelling System was replaced by the Republican Spelling System.

History 
He was a former inspector in a school at Bukittinggi, West Sumatra in the 1890s, before he became a professor of the Malay language at Leiden University in the Netherlands. Together with two native assistants, Engku Nawawi and Mohammed Taib Sultan Ibrahim, he published the new orthography on Kitab Logat Malajoe: Woordenlijst voor Spelling der Maleische Taal in 1901, and published a second book, Maleische Spraakkunst, in 1910. The latter was translated by T.W. Kamil into Tata Bahasa Melayu in 1983 and became the primary guide for the spelling and usage of the Malay language in Indonesia.

Characteristics 

The Van Ophuijsen system was modelled extensively on Dutch orthography, ostensibly to make pronunciation of Malay and Indonesian words more easily understandable to Dutch colonial authorities. Thus, the system used the Dutch variant of the Latin script, reflecting contemporaneous Dutch phonology. Some noticeable characteristics of this spelling system were:

 The digraph ⟨dj⟩ was used to write , for example .
 The digraph ⟨tj⟩ was used to write , for example .
 The digraph ⟨nj⟩ was used to write , for example .
 The digraph ⟨sj⟩ was used to write , for example .
 The digraph ⟨ch⟩ was used to write , for example .
 The letter ⟨é⟩ with an acute was used to write , while plain ⟨e⟩ indicated , for example  vs. .

Limitations 
While the Van Ophuijsen system greatly aided Dutch speakers in pronouncing the Indonesian language, its complete reliance on Dutch orthography, which is rich in digraphs and trigraphs, often resulted in unwieldy spellings of Indonesian words. For example:

This produced awkward spellings, sometimes with three vowels occurring in a row, e.g. koeat and djaoeh; modern spelling kuat and jauh ("strong" and "far").
 The diaeresis was often redundant, especially when indicating glottal stops in between two identical consecutive vowels, e.g. keboedajaän. However, there is no short/long vowel distinction in Indonesian. As such, it was not necessary to include a diaeresis in words such as keboedajaän, kebanggaän, keënakan and so on; the doubled vowels already signal that they are voiced separately, without the need for a diaeresis.

The perceived shortcomings of the Van Ophuijsen system led to the development of a partially revised orthography called the Republican Spelling System in 1947, and eventually to the adoption of the Enhanced Indonesian Spelling System in 1972.

Names
Van Ophuijsen spellings continue to be frequently used in Indonesian names like Soerjadjaja (Suryajaya, also written in a mixed spelling as Soeryadjaya). Since spelling of Indonesian names are highly fluid, usage can also be inconsistent: for example, Sukarno wrote his own name with a u, but signed it as Soekarno.

See also
 Republican Spelling System
 Enhanced Indonesian Spelling System

References 

 Dari Ejaan van Ophuijsen Hingga EYD 
 IPA for Indonesian Language
 Anton Moeliono, et al. (1997). Tata Bahasa Baku: Bahasa Indonesia. Balai Pustaka.

Indonesian language